

318001–318100 

|-bgcolor=#f2f2f2
| colspan=4 align=center | 
|}

318101–318200 

|-bgcolor=#f2f2f2
| colspan=4 align=center | 
|}

318201–318300 

|-bgcolor=#f2f2f2
| colspan=4 align=center | 
|}

318301–318400 

|-bgcolor=#f2f2f2
| colspan=4 align=center | 
|}

318401–318500 

|-id=412
| 318412 Tramelan ||  || Tramelan, a watch-making village situated in the south of the Swiss Franches-Montagnes district. || 
|}

318501–318600 

|-id=547
| 318547 Fidrich ||  || Róbert Fidrich (born 1969), a Hungarian amateur astronomer. || 
|}

318601–318700 

|-id=676
| 318676 Bellelay ||  || The monastery of Bellelay was founded in 1136 by Siginand. It is the home of the Swiss Jura cheese Tête de Moine, first made by the monks in the 12th century || 
|-id=682
| 318682 Carpaccio ||  || Vittore Carpaccio (1465–1525) was a Venetian painter of the Venetian school, who studied under Gentile Bellini. He is best known for a cycle of nine paintings, The Legend of Saint Ursula. || 
|-id=694
| 318694 Keszthelyi ||  || Sándor Keszthelyi (born 1952), a Hungarian architect and amateur astronomer. || 
|-id=698
| 318698 Barthalajos ||  || Lajos Bartha (born 1933), a Hungarian librarian, amateur astronomer and historian of astronomy. || 
|}

318701–318800 

|-id=723
| 318723 Bialas ||  || Volker Bialas (born 1938) received his doctorate in 1968 in Munich on the Rudolphine Tables of Johannes Kepler. From 1985 to 2003 he was Scientific Director of the publication of Kepler's Collected Works at the Bavarian Academy of Sciences. He is a member of the working group Johannes Kepler of the IAU. || 
|-id=794
| 318794 Uglia ||  || The Ukrainian Humanities Lyceum (UGL in Ukrainian) was founded in 1991. It is an innovative educational institution in the educational and scientific complex known as Modern Education, led by Kyiv National Taras Shevchenko University, a member of the UNESCO Associated schools. || 
|}

318801–318900 

|-bgcolor=#f2f2f2
| colspan=4 align=center | 
|}

318901–319000 

|-bgcolor=#f2f2f2
| colspan=4 align=center | 
|}

References 

318001-319000